Jon Lundblad (born 19 February 1982) is a Swedish former professional footballer who played as a forward.

References

1982 births
Living people
Sportspeople from Örebro
Swedish footballers
Association football forwards
Allsvenskan players
Ligue 2 players
Örebro SK players
Stade de Reims players
Ljungskile SK players
Swedish expatriate footballers
Swedish expatriate sportspeople in France
Expatriate footballers in France